Ruskin Bond (born 19 May 1934) is an Indian author    . His first novel, The Room on the Roof, was published in 1956, and it received the  John Llewellyn Rhys Prize in 1957. Bond has authored more than 500 short stories, essays, and novels which includes 69 books for children. He was awarded the Sahitya Akademi Award in 1992 for Our Trees Still Grow in Dehra. He was awarded the Padma Shri in 1999 and Padma Bhushan in 2014. He lives with his adopted family in Landour, Mussoorie, in the Indian state of Uttarakhand.

Life and career
Ruskin Bond  was born on 19th May 1934 
, in Kasauli, Punjab States Agency, British India. His father taught English to the princesses of Jamnagar palace and Ruskin and his sister Ellen lived there till he was six. Later, Ruskin's father joined the Royal Air Force in 1939 and Ruskin along with his mother and sister went to live at his maternal home at Dehradun. Shortly after that, he was sent to a boarding school in Mussoorie. When Ruskin was eight years old, his mother separated from his father and married a Punjabi Hindu, Hari. His father arranged for Ruskin to be brought to New Delhi where he was posted. He was very close to his father and describes this period with his father as one of the happiest times of his life. When he was ten, his father died during the war, while he was posted in Calcutta. Ruskin was at his boarding school in Shimla and was informed about this tragedy by his teacher. He was thoroughly heartbroken. Later, he was raised in Dehradun.

He did his schooling from Bishop Cotton School in Shimla, from where he graduated in 1951. He won several writing competitions in the school including the Irwin Divinity Prize and the Hailey Literature Prize. He wrote one of his first short stories, "Untouchable", at the age of sixteen in 1951.

Following his high school education he went to his aunt's home in the Channel Islands (U.K.) in 1951 for better prospects and stayed there for two years. In London when he was 17 years old, he started writing his first novel, The Room on the Roof, the semi-autobiographical story of the orphaned Anglo-Indian boy named Rusty; he did various jobs for a living. It won the John Llewellyn Rhys Prize, (1957) awarded to a British Commonwealth writer under 30. He moved to London and worked in a photo studio while searching for a publisher. After getting it published, Bond used the advance money to pay the sea passage to Bombay and settle in Dehradun.

He worked for a few years freelancing from Delhi and Dehradun. He sustained himself financially by writing short stories and poems for newspapers and magazines. On his youth, he said, "Sometimes I got lucky and some [work] got selected and I earned a few hundred rupees. Since I was in my 20s and didn't have any responsibilities I was just happy to be doing what I loved doing best." In 1963, he went to live in Mussoorie because besides liking the place, it was close to the editors and publishers in Delhi. He edited a magazine for four years. In the 1980s, Penguin set up in India and approached him to write some books. He had written Vagrants in the Valley in 1956, as a sequel to The Room on the Roof. These two novels were published in one volume by Penguin India in 1993. The following year a collection of his non-fiction writings, The Best of Ruskin Bond was published by Penguin India. His interest in supernatural fiction led him to write popular titles such as Ghost Stories from the Raj, A Season of Ghosts, and A Face in the Dark and other Hauntings. Since then he has written over five hundred short stories, essays and novels, including The Blue Umbrella, Funny Side Up, A Flight of Pigeons(Hindi film junoon was based on this story)  and more than 50 books for children. He has also published his autobiography: Scenes from a Writer's Life describes his formative years growing up in Anglo-India and a further autobiography, Lone Fox Dancing, was published in 2017. The Lamp is Lit is a collection of essays and episodes from his journal.

Since 1963 he has lived as a freelance writer in Mussoorie, a town in the Himalayan foothills in Uttarakhand where he lives with his adoptive family in Landour, Mussoorie's Ivy Cottage, which has been his home since 1980. Asked what he likes the most about his life, he said, "That I have been able to write for so long. I started at the age of 17 or 18 and I am still writing. If I were not a professional writer who was getting published I would still write." In his essay, "Scenes from a Writer's Life", he explains his Indian identity, "Race did not make me one. Religion did not make me one. But history did. And in the long run, it's history that counts."

His sister Ellen lived in Ludhiana with his stepsister until she died in 2014. He also has a brother, William, who lives in Canada.

Education
Most of his works are influenced by life in the hill stations at the foothills of the Himalayas, where he spent his childhood.The Room on the Roof, was written when he was 16 and published when he was 21. It was partly based on his experiences at Dehradun, in his small rented room on the roof, and his friends. His earlier works were written without it being meant for any particular readership. His first children's book, Angry River, published in the 1970s, had its writing toned down on a publisher's request for a children's story. On writing for children, he said, "I had a pretty lonely childhood and it helps me to understand a child better." Bond's work reflects his Anglo-Indian experiences and the changing political, social and cultural aspects of India, having been through colonial, postcolonial and post-independence phases of India.

Bond said that while his autobiographical work, Rain in the Mountains, was about his years spent in Mussoorie, Scenes from a Writer's Life described his first 21 years. Scenes from a Writer's Life focuses on Bond's trip to England, his struggle to find a publisher for his first book The Room on the Roof and his yearning to come back to India, particularly to Doon. "It also tells a lot about my parents", said Bond. "The book ends with the publication of my first novel and my decision to make writing my livelihood", Bond said, adding: "Basically, it describes how I became a writer".

Being a writer for over 50 years, Bond experimented with different genres; early works include fiction, short stories, novella with some being autobiographical. Later, he tried out non-fiction, romance and books for children. He said his favourite genres are essays and short stories. He considers himself a "visual writer" because for short stories, he first imagines it like a film and then notes it down. For an essay or travelogue, such planning is not needed for him. He feels the unexpected there makes it more exciting. Bond likes Just William by Richmal Crompton, Billy Bunter by Charles Hamilton and classics such as Alice in Wonderland and works by Charles Dickens and Mark Twain.

Filmography 
The 1978 Bollywood film Junoon is based on Bond's  novel A Flight of Pigeons (about an episode during the Indian Rebellion of 1857). It was produced by Shashi Kapoor and directed by Shyam Benegal.

The Rusty stories have been adapted into a Doordarshan TV series Ek Tha Rusty. Several stories have been incorporated into the school curriculum in India, including The Night Train at Deoli, Time Stops at Shamli and Our Trees Still Grow in Dehra.

In 2005, the Bollywood director Vishal Bhardwaj made a film based on his popular novel for children, The Blue Umbrella. The movie won the National Film Award for Best Children's Film.

Ruskin Bond made his maiden big-screen appearance with ain Vishal Bhardwaj's film 7 Khoon Maaf in 2011, based on his short story Susanna's Seven Husbands. Bond appears as a Bishop in the movie with Priyanka Chopra playing the title role. Bond had earlier collaborated with Bharadwaj in The Blue Umbrella which was also based on one of his works.

Rusty 
Rusty is a popular fictional character created by Ruskin Bond. Rusty is a sixteen-year-old Anglo-Indian boy living in Dehradun. He is orphaned and has no real family. He starts living with his guardian Mr. John Harrison, who is stern and harsh in his manners. Rusty is obliged to follow the orders and rules of his guardian and dares not disobey him. He feels helpless because he knows that if he disobeys Mr. John, he will get caned. He doesn't have any real friends and he finds himself very lonely in his guardian's house. He lives in the European part of Dehradun, but wants to embrace Indian culture and lifestyle. He makes friends with some Indian boys in the local marketplace. He hides the fact from Mr John and continues to go on secret adventures with them. Very soon he decides to run away from the captivity of Mr John and go back to England. Rusty's character offers a teenager's perspective who is battling with his confusions about life, relationship, happiness and love.

Inspiration for the character 
Rusty was created by Ruskin Bond to write stories about his own past. His first book, The Room on the Roof, which he wrote at the age of 17, was a semi-autobiographical story with Rusty being the protagonist. It was based on his friends and the time he spent in a rented room, when he was in Dehradun. Most of Rusty's initial years are set in the location of Dehradun, a scenic place in northern India. Ruskin Bond was deeply attached to Dehra and most of his stories are inspired by the hills and valleys of this region.

Novels and short stories featuring Rusty 

 The Room on the Roof
 Vagrants in the Valley (a sequel to Room on the Roof)
 Rusty, the Boy from the Hills (collection of short stories)
 Rusty Runs Away (collection of short stories)
  Rusty and the Magic Mountain
 Rusty goes to London
 Rusty Comes Home 
 The Adventures of Rusty
 Delhi is not far
"Rusty plays Holi"

Novels

 The Room on the Roof
 Vagrants in the Valley
 Rusty Runs Away
 A Flight of Pigeons
 The Sensualist
 The Panther's Moon
 Once Upon A Monsoon Time
 Delhi is Not Far
 Angry River
 Strangers in the Night
 All Roads Lead To Ganga
 Tales of Fosterganj
 Maharani
 Leopard on the Mountain
 Grandfather's Private Zoo
 The Blue Umbrella
 Too Much Trouble
 When The Tiger Was King
 "Cherry Tree"
 "The Great Train Journey"
 Children Of India
 Owls In The Family
 Dust On The Mountain
Adventures Of Toto
 The House Of Strange Stories
 Big Business
 When the Night Falls

Memories 
Landour Days – A writers Journal
Scenes from a Writer's Life
With Love From The Hills
Roads To Mussoorie
Looking for the Rainbow
Till the Clouds Roll By
Coming Round the Mountain
A Song of India
All the roads lead to Ganga

Non-fiction
 It's a Wonderful Life: Roads to Happiness
 A Golf Story: Celebrating 125 Years of the Bangalore Golf Club
 Happy Birthday, World!

See also

 List of Indian writers
 The Woman on Platform 8, a short story by Bond

References

External links

 Interview with Ruskin Bond by Atula Ahuja

Living people
1934 births
Anglo-Indian people
English-language writers from India
Ghost story writers
Indian male novelists
John Llewellyn Rhys Prize winners
Outlook (Indian magazine) people
Writers from Dehradun
Novelists from Uttarakhand
Recipients of the Padma Bhushan in literature & education
Recipients of the Padma Shri in literature & education
Recipients of the Sahitya Akademi Award in English
20th-century Indian novelists
Indian children's writers
People from Solan district
20th-century Indian male writers
Bishop Cotton School Shimla alumni